"The Golden Age" is a song recorded by  Danish indie pop band The Asteroids Galaxy Tour. The song was released as a single on September 13, 2009, as a digital download in Denmark from their debut studio album Fruit. The song was produced by Lars Iversen and written by Mette Lindberg and Lars Iversen. The song has charted in Austria, Spain, Switzerland, United Kingdom, Canada and United States.

Music video
A music video to accompany the release of "The Golden Age" was first released onto YouTube on August 7, 2009, at a total length of three minutes and fifty-six seconds. It features The Asteroids Galaxy Tour performing in the space which it has the planets of the solar system.

Allusions within the song
The song makes allusion to the Rat Pack of Hollywood. It later makes reference to the character Sally Bowles from the musical Cabaret, based on the Christopher Isherwood book Goodbye to Berlin.

Heineken and Deutsche Bahn advertisements
The song was used in a 2011 Heineken advertisement, as well as one in 2022 for Deutsche Bahn.  It has a long version of the entire song with a music video and a shorter one for commercial spots on television.

Track listing

Chart performance

Weekly

Year-end charts

Certifications

Release history

References

2009 singles
2009 songs